In the Whyte notation for the classification of steam locomotive wheel arrangement, a 2-4-4-0 is a locomotive with two leading wheels, two sets of four driving wheels, and no trailing wheels. Examples of this type were constructed as Mallet locomotives.

Examples
The Chemins de Fer Departmentaux Vivarais and the Chemins de Fer Departmentaux Lozère each possessed 2-4-4-0 Mallet locomotives. The Société Alsacienne de Constructions Mécaniques built three for  the Vivarais system in 1908 and two for the Lozère system in 1909.

Equivalent classifications
Other equivalent classifications are:
UIC classification: 1BB (also known as German classification and Italian classification)
French classification: 120+020
Turkish classification: 23+22
Swiss classification: 2/3+2/2
Russian classification: 1-2-0+0-2-0

The UIC classification is 1B'B.

References

 
44,2-4-4-0